Michael Norman Hazen (born January 7, 1976) is an American professional baseball executive and current executive vice president and general manager of the Arizona Diamondbacks of Major League Baseball (MLB). A Princeton University graduate and former minor league outfielder, he previously served as the GM and senior vice president of the Boston Red Sox and worked under Ben Cherington.

Early life
Hazen was born in Weymouth, Massachusetts, and grew up in nearby Abington. He played four years of varsity baseball for the Princeton Tigers and was selected in the 31st round by the San Diego Padres in the 1998 Major League Baseball draft. After batting .307 with 62 hits in the Rookie-level Pioneer League with the Idaho Falls Chukars in 1998, he was promoted to the Class A Fort Wayne Wizards of the Midwest League. He batted only .203 in 72 games played in 1999 and a chronic shoulder injury ended his active career.

Career
Hazen joined the Cleveland Indians as an intern then became one of the club's advance scouts in 2001–02. Promoted to assistant director of professional scouting in 2003, he then spent two full seasons (2004–05) as Cleveland's assistant director of player development, working directly under John Farrell, who would serve as manager of the Red Sox from 2013–17.

Hazen initially came to the Red Sox as director of player development in February 2006 (Farrell would follow as the team's pitching coach eight months later), and then was named vice president, player development and amateur scouting, in 2011. He was promoted to vice president and assistant general manager (under Cherington) in 2012, then named a senior vice president and assistant GM in early 2015. On September 23, 2015, Hazen was named general manager by the Red Sox' president of baseball operations, Dave Dombrowski. Although Dombrowski assumed final authority for baseball decisions, Hazen served as a top aide and had input in the club's decision-making.
During his one full season in the post, Boston won the 2016 American League East Division championship, but fell in the ALDS to the eventual league champions, the Indians.

On October 16, 2016, Hazen agreed to become the executive vice president and general manager of the Arizona Diamondbacks, to serve as the team's top baseball operations executive.

On June 11, 2021, Hazen announced he would be taking a physical leave of absence to spend more time with his wife Nicole, who was battling brain cancer. Hazen stated that he didn’t feel he could devote the time required to lead the team’s trade deadline and draft preparation while attending to his family responsibilities.

Hazen's wife Nicole succumbed to her cancer on August 4, 2022.

References

External links

1976 births
Living people
Arizona Diamondbacks executives
Boston Red Sox executives
Cleveland Indians executives
Cleveland Indians scouts
Fort Wayne Wizards players
Idaho Falls Braves players
Major League Baseball farm directors
Major League Baseball general managers
People from Abington, Massachusetts
Princeton Tigers baseball players